The V-Dem Institute (Varieties of Democracy) is an independent research institute founded by Professor Staffan I. Lindberg in 2014 that studies the qualities of government. The institute is funded by a number of government organizations, World Bank and several research institutions. The headquarters of the project is based at the department of political science, University of Gothenburg, Sweden.

Democracy indices 

The V-Dem Institute publishes a number of high-profile datasets that describe qualities of different governments, annually published and publicly available for free. These datasets are a popular dataset among political scientists, due to information on hundreds of indicator variables describing all aspects of government, especially on the quality of democracy, inclusivity, and other economic indicators. Compared to other measures of democracy (such as the Polity data series and Freedom House's Freedom in the World), the V-Dem Institute's measures of democracy are more granular and 2020 included "more than 470 indicators, 82 mid-level indices, and 5 high-level indices covering 202 polities from the period of 1789–2019." Political scientist Daniel Hegedus describes V-Dem as "the most important provider of quantitative democracy data for scholarly research."

The V-Dem institute also republishes 59 other indicators, and several other indices which are created, in part, with the assistance of V-Dem indices. The Digital Society Project is a subset of indicators on V-Dem's survey which asks questions about the political status of social media and the internet.

The V-Dem institute also frequently publishes reports on various topics. An annual Democracy Report that describes the state of democracy in the world. The Democracy Report, the dataset, scientific articles, and working papers are free to download on the institute’s website, which also features interactive graphic tools.

See also 
 Democracy index

References

Further reading
  Max Fisher, "U.S. Allies Drive Much of World’s Democratic Decline, Data Shows: Washington-aligned countries backslid at nearly double the rate of non-allies, data shows, complicating long-held assumptions about American influence" New York Times Nov 16, 2021
 Vanessa A. Boese, Markus Eberhardt: Which Institutions Rule? Unbundling the Democracy-Growth Nexus, V-Dem Institute, Series 2022:131, February 2022

External links
 Official website

Political research institutes
Research institutes in Sweden
University of Gothenburg